In Boolean logic, a product term is a conjunction of literals, where each literal is
either a variable or its negation.

Examples
Examples of product terms include:

Origin
The terminology comes from the similarity of AND
to multiplication as in the ring structure of Boolean rings.

Minterms
For a boolean function of  variables , a product term in which each of the  variables appears once (in either its complemented or uncomplemented form) is called a minterm. Thus, a minterm is a logical expression of n variables that employs only the complement operator and the conjunction operator.

References
Fredrick J. Hill, and Gerald R. Peterson, 1974, Introduction to Switching Theory and Logical Design, Second Edition, John Wiley & Sons, NY, 

Boolean algebra